The Junior World Orienteering Championships (JWOC) are an annual orienteering competition. They were first held in 1990. Entry is open to national teams aged 20 and below as of 31 December in the year of competition. Representative countries must be members of the International Orienteering Federation (IOF).

History
An international junior match was arranged first time in 1983 in Ry, Denmark, and then in 1984 (Hartberg, Austria) and 1985 (Font-Romeau, France). From 1986 (in Pécs, Hungary) the events became the unofficial Junior European Championships, and were held the following years, 1987 (Ambleside, England), 1988 (Eupen, Belgium) and 1989 (Seefeld/Kufstein, Austria). From 1990 (Älvsbyn, Sweden), the competition became official Junior World Orienteering Championships.

Current program
Current program (from 2022) includes:

Individual Sprint Event (Straight Final)
Sprint Relay 
Individual Middle Distance Event (Consists of a qualifier and ranked finals)
Individual Long Distance Event (Straight Final)
Team Relay

Originally JWOC started with an Individual (Classic) competition followed by a relay. The Short Distance Championships were added in 1991, which remained until 2004 where the Short Distance became the Middle Distance, falling into line with the World Orienteering Championships.
An unofficial Sprint Race was held in Switzerland in 2005 in conjunction with the PostFinance-Sprint . Shortly following this event the Sprint discipline was added to the program for Lithuania 2006. From 2022 the Sprint relay discipline was added with four runners in each team. Two women (1st & 4th leg) and two men (2nd &3rd leg).

Host towns/cities

Individual/Classic/Long
This event was called "Classic distance" from 1991 to 2003, and since 2004 it is called "Long distance".

Men

Women

Short/Middle distance
This event was called "Short distance" from 1991 to 2003. Since 2004 it is called "Middle distance".

Men

Women

Sprint
This event was first held in 2006.

Men

Women

Sprint Relay

Relay

Men

Women

Medal table
Updated after JWOC 2019.

The 2006 Junior World Champion in the long distance event for women was Johanna Allston (or Hanny Allston) of Australia. It was the first time in this event that a gold medal has been won by a non-European nation. Since then, Matt Ogden (2012), Aston Key (2019), and Tim Robertson (2014 and 2015), are the only non-Europeans to win gold medals at the Junior World Championships.

Gallery

See also
World Orienteering Championships
European Orienteering Championships
World University Orienteering Championships
Orienteering World Cup

Notes

References

June sporting events
July sporting events
Junior
Recurring sporting events established in 1990